Heliosia rufa is a moth of the family Erebidae. It was described by John Henry Leech in 1890. It is found in the Russian Far East (Primorye) and China.

Subspecies
Heliosia rufa rufa
Heliosia rufa ussuriensis Bang-Haas, 1927 (southern Primorye)

References

Nudariina
Moths described in 1890